Serenata a Maria (literally "Serenade for Maria") is a 1957 Italian musical melodrama film co-written and directed by Luigi Capuano and starring  Maria Fiore and Sergio Bruni.

Trama    
When Stefano Apicella, after having completed his studies at a music conservatory with the help of an uncle, returns to the town, he finds that the creditors are seizing his uncle's boats. Fortunately, a friend of Stefano's, the painter Pasqualino, with a brilliant cheat, saves the situation. In the village Stefano meets Maria, for whom he had a tender feeling in other times, and little by little love is rekindled between the two. But during Stefano's absence, Maria met Renato, an unscrupulous man who deceived her and made her a mother, and now threatens a scandal, thus forcing Maria to leave the country. In the meantime Stefano has put together an orchestra and the success brought back to town leads him to move with his companions to the city, where success is renewed, and the ensemble can be produced on radio and television. Stefano learned by chance the painful story of Maria and during the TV broadcast he addresses simple and affectionate expressions to the woman he loves, which only she can understand. Mary receives the secret message and after various alternatives, the two can crown their dream of love on the day when Mary's little daughter receives Confirmation.

Cast 
 Maria Fiore as Pupella Cagliano 
 Sergio Bruni as Stefano Rota
 Leda Gloria as Pupella's mother
 Pietro De Vico as Pasqualino, the painter
 Marisa Belli as Maria, Pupella's sister
 Andrea Aureli as Alfredo, Maria's lover
 Amedeo Trilli as Salvatore Rota 
 Pina Gallini as The Shopkeeper
 Nerio Bernardi

References

External links

1957 romantic drama films
Films directed by Luigi Capuano
1957 films
Italian romantic drama films
Melodrama films
Italian black-and-white films
1950s Italian films